was a fudai feudal domain under the Tokugawa shogunate of  Edo period Japan.  It was located in southern Ōmi Province, in the Kansai region of central Honshu. The domain was centered at Zeze Castle, located on the shore of Lake Biwa in what is now the city of Ōtsu in Shiga Prefecture.

History
Zeze controlled entry into Kyoto from the east, and was thus of great strategic importance to the Tokugawa shogunate. As with many of the fudai domains of the early Edo period, the control of Zeze Domain changed frequently between various clans; however, after the appointment of a cadet branch of the Honda clan in 1651, the domain remained under Honda control until the end of the shogunate. With a kokudaka of 70,00 koku at its height, it was the second largest domain in Ōmi Province after Hikone Domain.

In 1601, shortly after the Battle of Sekigahara, Tokugawa Ieyasu ordered then construction of Zeze Castle, and assigned Toda Kazuaki, formerly  5000 koku hatamoto with holdings in Musashi Province to be daimyō of the new 30,000 koku domain. He built the  jōkamachi  and developed shijimi clans as a local industry. His son, Toda Ujikane distinguished himself at the Siege of Osaka and was awarded with the larger Amagasaki Domain. Zeze was awarded to Honda Yasutoshi, who had also distinguished himself at the Siege of Osaka. His son, Honda Toshitsugu, was relocated to Nishio Domain in 1621. Zeze then passed briefly to the Suganuma and the Ishikawa clans, before being returned to Honda Yoshitsugu in 1651, but with an increase in kokudaka to 70,000 koku.

Under the early days of Hondo rule, the domain prospered greatly with flood control works and the opening of new rice lands continuing to revenues ad with welfare measures for the poor. However, by the middle of the Edo period, the domain's finances began to falter, and under the 6th  daimyō Honda Yasutada, failed attempts at fiscal reform only made matters worse. There were widespread peasant's uprisings around 1781. Conditions continued to deteriorate until the time of the 10th  daimyō Honda Yasusada, with conflict erupting between various factions of the domain's retainers over reform measures. The situation resulted in intervention by the shogunate and the purge of a number of senior retainers. The situation stabilized by 1808, when a han school was opened.

During the Bakumatsu period, Zeze was violently divided between the pro-Sonnō Jōi faction and the pro-shogunate faction. The pro-shogunate faction, at times assisted by the Shinsengumi killed a number of the pro-Sonnō Jōi faction, including some prominent officials. This created a backlash in popular opinion, and with the start of the Boshin War, the domain quickly sided with the imperial cause and sent troops to attack Kuwana Domain. As with other domains, Zeze was abolished in 1871 with the abolition of the han system, becoming Zeze Prefecture, which was merged with Ōtsu prefecture, and subsequently Shiga Prefecture.

Bakumatsu period holdings
As with most domains in the han system, Ōmizo Domain consisted of a discontinuous territories calculated to provide the assigned kokudaka, based on periodic cadastral surveys and projected agricultural yields.

Ōmi Province
21 villages in Shiga District
76 villages in Kurita District
1 village in Kōka District
7 villages in Azai District
5 villages in Ika District
18 villages in Takashima District
Kawachi Province
15 villages in Nishgori District

List of daimyō

{| class=wikitable
! #||Name || Tenure || Courtesy title || Court Rank || kokudaka
|-
|colspan=6|  Toda clan, 1601-1617 (fudai)
|-
||1||||1601–1604||Uneme-no-kami (采女正)|| Junior 5th Rank, Lower Grade (従五位下)||30,000 koku
|-
||2||||1604–1617||Uneme-no-kami (采女正)|| Junior 5th Rank, Lower Grade (従五位下)||30,000 koku
|-
|colspan=6|  Honda clan, 1617-1621 (fudai)
|-
||1||||1617–1621||Hayato no Shō (隼人正) || Junior 5th Rank, Lower Grade (従五位下)||30,000 koku
|-
||2||||1621–1621||Shimōsa-no-kami (下総守)|| Junior 5th Rank, Lower Grade (従五位下)||30,000 koku
|-
|colspan=6|  Suganuma clan, 1621-1634 (fudai)
|-
||1||||1621–1634||Oribe-no-tsukasa (織部正)|| Junior 5th Rank, Lower Grade (従五位下)||31,000 koku
|-
|colspan=6|  Ishikawa clan, 1634-1651 (fudai)
|-
||1||||1634–1650||Tonomo-no-kami (主殿頭)|| Junior 4th Rank, Lower Grade (従四位下)||53,000 koku
|-
||2||||1651–1651||Tonomo-no-kami (主殿頭)|| Junior 4th Rank, Lower Grade (従四位下)|53,000 koku
|-
|colspan=6|  Honda clan, 1651-1871 (fudai)
|-
||2||||1651–1664||Shimōsa-no-kami (下総守)|| Junior 5th Rank, Lower Grade (従五位下)||70,000 koku
|-
||3||||1664–1679||Hyōbu-shōyu (兵部少輔)|| Junior 5th Rank, Lower Grade (従五位下)||70,000 koku
|-
||4||||1679–1714||Oki-no-kami (隠岐守)|| Junior 5th Rank, Lower Grade (従五位下)||70,000 koku
|-
||5||||1714–1719||Shimōsa-no-kami (下総守)|| Junior 5th Rank, Lower Grade (従五位下)||70,000 koku
|-
||6||||1719–1747||Shuzen-no-kami (主膳正)|| Junior 5th Rank, Lower Grade (従五位下)||70,000 koku
|-
||7||||1747–1765||Oki-no-kami (隠岐守)|| Junior 5th Rank, Lower Grade (従五位下)||70,000 koku
|-
||8||||1765–1765||Shimōsa-no-kami (下総守)|| Junior 5th Rank, Lower Grade (従五位下)||70,000 koku
|-
||9||||1765–1771||Oki-no-kami (隠岐守)|| Junior 5th Rank, Lower Grade (従五位下)||70,000 koku
|-
||10||||1771–1781||Shuzen-no-kami (主膳正)|| Junior 5th Rank, Lower Grade (従五位下)||70,000 koku
|-
||11||||1781–1806||Oki-no-kami (隠岐守)|| Junior 5th Rank, Lower Grade (従五位下)||70,000 koku
|-
||12||||1806–1847||Hyōbu-daisuke (兵部大輔)|| Junior 4th Rank, Lower Grade (従四位下)||70,000 koku
|-
||13||||1847–1856|| Oki-no-kami (隠岐守)|| Junior 5th Rank, Lower Grade (従五位下)||70,000 koku
|-
||14||||1856–1871||Shuzen-no-kami (主膳正)|| Junior 2nd Rank (従二位)||70,000 koku
|-
|}

See also
List of Han

References
The content of this article was largely derived from that of the corresponding article on Japanese Wikipedia.

External links

Notes

Domains of Japan
1601 establishments in Japan
History of Shiga Prefecture
Ōmi Province